I Dream of You is the ninth album from Christian music singer-songwriter JJ Heller, which released on April 29, 2014, by Stone Table Records, and it was produced by Ben Shive. The album received three positive reviews and saw commercial charting successes.

Background
JJ Heller released the album entitled I Dream of You on April 29, 2014, through Stone Table Records, and it was produced by Ben Shive. This album is a collection of lullabies that was funded via a Kickstarter campaign.

Critical reception

I Dream of You garnered three positive review from music critics. At New Release Tuesday, Kevin Davis rated the album four stars out of five, stating that "I Dream of You is a soothing and emotionally moving listening experience." April Covington of Christian Music Review rated the album four-and-a-half stars out of five, writing that "The music is light and brings about warm feelings." At CM Addict, Brianne Bellomy rated the album four stars out of five, saying that simply it is a "beautiful project."

Commercial performance
For the Billboard charting week of May 17, 2014, I Dream of You was the No. 23 most sold album in the Folk Albums market and it was the No. 43 most sold album in the breaking-and-entry category via the Top Heatseekers Albums.

Track listing

Chart performance

Album

References

2014 albums